Xanlıqlar (also, Khanlyglar) is a village and municipality in the Sharur District of Nakhchivan, Azerbaijan. It is located 8 km in the south-east from the district center, on the Sharur plain. Its population is busy with vine-growing and animal husbandry. There is a grape processing factory, secondary school, club, library and a medical center in the village. It has a population of 2,091. There exist a sanctuary named "Imamzade" in the village.

Etymology
The settlement was so named because it has been built in the property territory named Khanlyg (Khanate) which belonged to the Nakhchivan Khans.

References 

Populated places in Sharur District